Bookwalter is an unincorporated community in Pawnee County, Nebraska, United States.

History
A post office was established at Bookwalter in 1890, and remained in operation until it was discontinued in 1919. The community was named for W. J. Bookwalter, the original owner of the town site.

References

Unincorporated communities in Pawnee County, Nebraska
Unincorporated communities in Nebraska